Tuomisto is a Finnish surname. Notable people with the surname include:

Satu Tuomisto, Finnish choreographer
Satu Tuomisto (born 1986), Finnish model
Pekka Tuomisto (born 1960), Finnish ice hockey player

Finnish-language surnames